The Owasso Reporter is a weekly newspaper in Owasso, Oklahoma. Founded in 1964, it is published every Wednesday by Tulsa World Media Company, a Berkshire Hathaway Media Group company.

References

External links
OwassoReporter.com
Owasso Reporter Facebook Page

Newspapers published in Oklahoma
Publications established in 1964